Saalbau Essen is a concert venue in Essen, Germany, the home of the Essen Philharmonic. The original building was completed in 1902, and destroyed during World War II on 26 July 1943. It was rebuilt between 1949 and 1954 and completely renovated in 2003 and 2004. The Saalbau Essen is located a little bit south of the city center close to the Aalto Theatre. Since the 2013/2014 season Tomáš Netopil has been the music director of Essener Philharmonic. Also since 2013/2014 Hein Mulders has been the intendant of the Saalbau Essen.

History 
The first concert venue at the same place, the so-called Stadtgartensaal, was opened in 1864. A new concert venue was built in 1901 at the same place – the first Saalbau. At the opening on 24 September 1904 conducted Richard Strauss. The design of the building was affected by the Art Nouveau movement.

Gustav Mahler conducted here in 1906 at the 42. Tonkünstlerfestes (sound artist festival) of the Allgemeiner Deutscher Musikverein the world premiere of his 6. Sinfonie, followed by Max Reger in 1913 with the world premiere of his Böcklin-Suite. The Saalbau was destroyed in World War II on 26 July 1943 together with the city center of Essen.

After World War II, between 1949 and 1954, a modernized version was rebuilt. The most significant attribute of the building was the copper roof of the building. The white hall (Weiße Saal) got a unique ceramic wall from Charles Crodel.

Philharmonie today 
Between 2002 and 2004, the Saalbau was refurbished at the cost of 72 million Euro. During this time, the Alfried-Krupp-Saal was extended at the back side. The building was reopened on 4 June 2004.

Entrance and lobby  
Some parts of the building were converted to the state of the 1950s, for example the entrance and the lobby (Wandelhalle).

At the main entrance are some small cash boxes, at the top are some historical candleholder. The cash boxes have been used only for short time, as they are too small and have no IT connection.

The wardrobe site of the lobby is made from marble, the other sides are made from beton.

Alfried Krupp Hall 
The Alfried Krupp Hall (Alfried-Krupp-Saal) is the central and biggest venue. The design consists of bright wood paneling and warm colors. The red steel construction elements are references to the company Krupp

During an acoustic test it was observed that the steel elements should not be covered for acoustical reasons. Therefore, they are still undisguised and visible. The hall has places for 1906 people. The stage size can be adjusted to the size of the ensemble.

The stage together with the parquet can be adjusted in the high to the level of the balcony. Then the hall can be used as Ballroom or for shareholder venue.

At the head end of the venue is the pipe organ from Kuhn.

RWE-Pavillon 
The installation of the new RWE-Pavillon was sponsored by the energy provider RWE and is located between the two staircases of the Saalbau. It is an extension to the historical part of the building. It offers room for up to 400 people. Inside the room are two artworks of the artist Thomas Schütte.

Festival room 
The festival room (Festsaal) offers place for up to 238 people. The wall paneling is made from mahogany and pear wood.

Color halls 
The color halls (Bunte Säle) of the conference centre are above the Wandelhalle.

The white hall is the medium room. It consists of a ceramic wall from Charles Crodel date in the 1950s. They are covered with motives of the European myths.

The green hall is covered by pear wood. The Bauhaus design was recovered during the refreshment in 2004.

Club rooms 
There are three club rooms (Clubräume) Richard Strauss, Gustav Mahler and Max Reger for up to 44 people.

Kuhn-organ 
The instrument has 62 organ stops (4502 organ pipes) on three manuals and pedal keyboard. The instrument had a price of 1,2  million Euro.

Critics 
Critics have repeatedly voted the Essen Philharmonic as Germany's Orchestra of the Year.

Public transport  
The Essen Stadtbahn station Philharmonie is located near the Saalbau and named after it.

References

External links

Saalbau details, Essen Philharmonic

Buildings and structures in Essen
Concert halls in Germany
Art Nouveau architecture in Germany
1902 establishments in Germany
Music venues completed in 1902